Sir John Boys (1607 – 8 October 1664) is best known as the Royalist Governor of Donnington Castle in Berkshire during the English Civil War.

Early life
Boys was born in at Bonnington, near to Goodnestone, in Kent, the eldest son and heir of Edward Boys of Bonnington, by Jane, a daughter of Edward Sanders (of Northborne). He was baptized at Chillenden, on 5 April 1607.

In 1641, John Boys was promoted from captain to lieutenant colonel when he came to serve the King in John Savage, Earl Rivers's Regiment in Ireland. He was colonel in all but name, however, as Earl Rivers never took command of the Regiment in the field.

Defence of Donnington Castle
Donnington Castle is located north of the town of Newbury. It was garrisoned in 1643 for King Charles I and commanded the road from Oxford to Southampton and the road from London to Bath.  It was, from 1643, under the command of Lieutenant-Colonel John Boys, who spent £1,000 on earthworks to strengthen the defences. Boys commanded a division of the Earl Rivers's Royalist Regiment consisting of 200 foot, 25 horse, and 4 guns, which remained throughout the siege.

On 31 July 1644, Donnington Castle was attacked by a division of the New Model Army of 3000 horses and dragoons, under the command of Lieutenant-General John Middleton, but without any artillery support. Middleton attempted to compel a surrender from Boys, but the Parliamentary army was repulsed with the loss of at least 300 men.

About a month later, on 29 September, Colonel Jeremy Horton began a 12-day blockade laying siege to Donnington, having raised a battery at the foot of the hill, near Newbury he was able to shatter the southern towers of the castles medieval defenses and reduce a part of the wall to rubble. It has been estimated that at least 1000 missiles were fired against the fortress during this engagement. Even though Colonel Horton had been reinforced, Governor John Boys refused to concede and even invited Horton to surrender his forces.

A parliamentarian army soon after returned on 4 October led by the Earl of Manchester. An attempt to storm the castle failed, but the bombardment continued for several days without avail. Frustrated, the whole army dispersed as Charles I, at the head of the Royal army, moved towards Donnington. For his great services in defense of the castle Governor John Boys was knighted on 21 October 1644. The king also promoted him to full colonel in Earl Rivers's Regiment.

On 27 October, the second battle of Newbury was fought, and Colonel Sir John Boys secured the King's artillery under the walls of Donnington castle. The famous Parliamentarian soldier Sir William Waller surrounded the castle with his army and again Boys refused to surrender.

After the battle of Newbury, when the King had gone to Oxford, the Earl of Essex besieged Donnington Castle, but abandoned the attempt before Charles returned in the first week of November 1644 to relieve Donnington. The King took his "treasure and guns," leaving some of the heavier pieces for use by the garrison.

Some time after 14 November 1645, Oliver Cromwell himself turned his attention to the problem of the Royalist stronghold of Donnington castle, and in the following spring a furious bombardment with cannon and mortars was ordered. By 30 March a truce was concluded, and Charles had no option other than to instruct Boys to obtain the best possible surrender. On 1 April 1646, the surrender was completed, wherein  garrison was permitted to march to the Royalist garrison at Wallingford Castle with their colours flying and drums beating. Boys did not join them, instead he went to London rather than take part in any further military resistance.

Later history
He was made Lord Warden of the Cinque Ports in 1646. During August 1648, he made a futile attempt to raise the Siege of Walmer Castle in Deal, one of the Cinque Ports, and customary home of the Lord Warden. Sir Algernon Sydney replaced him as Warden in 1648.

In 1659, Boys was held as a prisoner in Dover Castle for "petitioning for a free Parliament", but was released on 23 February 1660. He was then, reputedly, granted the office of Receiver of Customs at Dover from Charles II.

A few years later, on 8 October 1664, Sir John Boys died at his house at Bonnington and was buried in the parish church of Goodnestone-next-Wingham (near Canterbury) in Kent.

Personal life
He was married three times, and had five daughters by his first wife Lucy.
His second marriage was to Ann Brockman, daughter of Sir William Brockman of Newington-next-Hythe in 1650.  She died in 1651.
His third marriage was to the Lady Elizabeth Finch, widow of Sir Nathaniel Finch, and a daughter of Sir John Fotherby of Barham (Kent).

Notes

References

External links

1607 births
1664 deaths
Lords Warden of the Cinque Ports
People from the Borough of Ashford
People from Shaw-cum-Donnington
Cavaliers